Edward Smythe (died 1714), was MP for Leicestershire.

Edward Smythe may also refer to:

Sir Edward Smythe, 4th Baronet (1719–1784), of the Smythe Baronets
Sir Edward Smythe, 5th Baronet (1758–1811), of the Smythe Baronets
Sir Edward Smythe, 6th Baronet (1787–1856), of the Smythe Baronets
Sir Edward Smythe, 9th Baronet (1869–1942), of the Smythe Baronets

See also
Edward Smyth (disambiguation)
Edward Smith (disambiguation)